Sri Siraniama (Khmer script: ស៊ីសៈងាម, Sra Niem,  1410s or 1420s) was initially the consort of Entho Reachea, who ruled the Angkorian Empire after it was captured by his father Ramesuan. When Ponhea Yat assassinated Entho Reachea and took over Angkor, he made her his queen.

It was said that after the assassination the Cambodians massacred the Siamese and opened the gates. When he entered the palace, Ponhea Yat found there a pretty Siamese woman who was crying. Interrogated by him, she lowered her head, and looking at him "with the tips of her eyes" replied that her name was Siraniama and that she was a Ayutthaya princess. Ponhea Yat found her so pretty that he married her.

She had at least two sons with Ponhea Yat, who ruled as Barom Reachea (II):
Gamakatra, whom Ponhea Yat abdicated for in  1431 and who ruled as Noreay Reachea
Dharmaraja

References

Year of birth missing
Year of death missing
15th-century Cambodian women
15th-century Thai women
15th-century Thai people
Cambodian queens
Thai princesses